Maabatli ( or  Mobetan), also known as Mabeta, is a town in northern Syria, administratively part of the Aleppo Governorate, located northwest of Aleppo in the center of Afrin District. Nearby localities include Afrin to the southeast, Rajo to the northwest and Jindires to the south. The town is also the administrative center of the Maabatli nahiyah of the Afrin District with a combined population of 11,741. Previously controlled by the YPG since 2012, Syrian National Army forces took control of the city alongside the Afrin city center on March 18, 2018.

Demographics 
The majority of its inhabitants are of Kurdish ethnicity and are mostly Alevis. In the 1930s Kurdish Alevis who fled the persecution of the Turkish Army during the Maras Massacre, settled in Mabeta.

References

Populated places in Afrin District
Towns in Aleppo Governorate
Kurdish communities in Syria